John Bertrand Conlan (September 17, 1930 – June 18, 2021) was an American lawyer and Republican politician. He served as a State Senator from 1965 to 1972 and as a United States representative from Arizona from 1973 to 1977.

Early life and career
Born in Oak Park, Illinois, Conlan was the son of Ruth (Anderson) and Hall of Fame baseball umpire Jocko Conlan. He attended Illinois public schools and received a B.S. from Northwestern University, where he joined Delta Upsilon. He later graduated from Harvard Law School, received a Fulbright Scholarship to study at the University of Cologne, and studied at The Hague Academy of International Law. Conlan was admitted to the Illinois bar in 1954 and commenced practice in Chicago. He then served as a captain in the U.S. Army from 1956 to 1961. Conlan has also taught geo-politics and American foreign policy at Arizona State University and the University of Maryland. He continued to practice law in Phoenix, Arizona. Conlan served in the Arizona Senate from 1965 to 1973.

U.S. House of Representatives
In 1976, he ran for the United States Senate to succeed retiring Republican Senator Paul Fannin. He was opposed in the Republican primary by fellow U.S. Representative Sam Steiger which Conlan narrowly lost.  The general election was won by former Pima County Attorney Dennis DeConcini.

During his time in Congress, he became a critic of the elementary school curriculum known as Man: A Course of Study, which taught students about the lifestyle and culture of the Netsilik Inuit. At its peak in 1972, the curriculum was being taught to 400,000 students nationwide. Conlan claimed the program had an ideological bias and promoted cultural relativism. This ignited a controversy centered in Phoenix, Arizona, that led the National Science Foundation to cut funding for the curriculum in 1975, after which it ceased to be used.

He died on June 18, 2021, in Asheville, North Carolina, at age 90.

References

This article incorporates material from the public domain Biographical Directory of the United States Congress.

External links

1930 births
2021 deaths
Northwestern University alumni
Harvard Law School alumni
The Hague Academy of International Law people
People from Oak Park, Illinois
Politicians from Phoenix, Arizona
Military personnel from Illinois
Arizona lawyers
Illinois lawyers
Illinois Republicans
Arizona state senators
Republican Party members of the United States House of Representatives from Arizona